Green Archer or The Green Archer may refer to:

 De La Salle Green Archers, the De La Salle University men's varsity team
 Green Archer (radar), a British mortar locating radar of the 1960s and 1970s
 The Green Archer (1923), a novel by Edgar Wallace
 The Green Archer (1925 serial), a 1925 Pathé film serial directed by Spencer Gordon Bennet
 The Green Archer (1940 serial), a 1940 Columbia Pictures film serial directed by James W. Horne
 The Green Archer (1961 film), a 1961 German film directed by Jürgen Roland

See also
 Robin Hood, a heroic outlaw in English folklore who, according to legend, was a highly skilled archer and swordsman 
 Green Arrow, a fictional superhero who appears in comic books published by DC Comics